are schools that specifically cater to Brazilians living in Japan. This is either due to parents wanting their children to attend school in their native language, or because they have little experience with or knowledge of Japanese culture or language.

In 1995 there were five Brazilian schools in Japan. In 2008 there were about 100 Brazilian schools in the country. According to the Japanese Ministry of Education, there are more than 80 such schools across Japan as of 2009, 53 of which have received official approval by the Brazilian government. Between 30 and 200 students are enrolled at each of these schools. In addition to these, it is likely there are many more unlicensed schools in operation.

Tuition
The tuition fee for these schools can reach about 30 thousand yen per month for one student.

The 2007-2010 global downturn has put many schools in a difficult position. Since they receive no assistance from the state and rely completely on tuition fees to operate, the schools are struggling since unemployed parents are unable to pay for tuition, with numerous schools forced to close.

Facilities
Most schools operate from small rented properties, with no grounds or gymnasiums.

Some schools operate school buses for their students.

See also
List of Brazilian schools in Japan
Brazilians in Japan
Japanese Brazilian
Fushūgaku
Education in Brazil

Further reading
 The book: Nikkei Brazilians at a Brazilian School in Japan

Available online:
 Li, Hongshi (李紅実) and Hideaki Shibuya (渋谷 英章 Shibuya Hideaki) (Tokyo Gakugei University). "The Role of “Private School” on Education Assurance: Comparison of Nong-min-gong children’s Schools and Brazilian Schools" (Archive); 教育保障における「私立学校」の役割 : 中国農民工子弟学校と在日ブラジル人学校の比較). Bulletin of Tokyo Gakugei University. Educational sciences (東京学芸大学紀要. 総合教育科学系). Tokyo Gakugei University, 2015-02-27. Vol.66 no.1 p. 39-53. - English abstract available on p. 15/16. - Profile at eTopia (Tokyo Gakugei University Repository) - See profile at CiNii.

Not available online:
 小貫 大輔. "Portuguese and Japanese Writing Competence of High School Students in Brazilian Schools in Japan" (ブラジル学校高校生のポルトガル語と日本語の作文力調査(中間報告) (アイデンティティの多様性と共生(コアプロジェクト1))). Civilizations (文明) (18), 33-35, 2013. 東海大学文明研究所 ; 2003-. See profile at CiNii.

References

Japan
Brazilian diaspora in Japan
Japanese-Brazilian culture
Schools in Japan
Brazil–Japan relations